Vahur Väljamäe (born in 1968) is an Estonian military personnel.

In the 1990s, he was the Chief of Guard Battalion.

In 1997, he was awarded with Order of the Cross of the Eagle, IV class.

References

Living people
1968 births
Estonian military personnel
Recipients of the Military Order of the Cross of the Eagle, Class IV